The Potosí mountain range in Bolivia is situated east and southeast of the city of Potosí. It is at least 25 km long stretching from north to south. Its highest mountain is Khunurana (Anaruyu) rising up to 5,071 m (16,637 ft). The features of the range are considered the product of volcanic activity known as the Khari Khari caldera (19º43'S; 65º38'W). The caldera is about 40 km long and 25 km at its widest point.

The range was named Cordillera de Potosí  by the German alpinist Henry Hoek in 1903. He collected information about the range like the local names and published several papers about it. The inhabitants of the area, however, use the names Khari Khari for the northern part and Anta Q'awa for the southern one. The two sections are separated by a depression, the Jach'a Molino Pampa.

Mountains

Khari Khari range 
The Khari Khari range contains a number of mountains which are more than 4,900 m high, the highest elevation being Khari Khari (5,040 m). Other mountains are listed below:

Cerro Rico lies west of the main range.

Anta Q'awa range 
South of Jach'a Molino Pampa, in the Anta Q'awa range, there are:

Lakes 
During the colonial epoch artificial lakes were built in the Khari Khari range, finally up to 32 lakes. The main purpose was to produce hydroelectric power to run the smelters of the mines. Some of these lakes are still used today for the water supply of the city. Today there are 22 lakes of the Khari Khari range belonging to six systems:
 the Pati Pati system with 3 lakes: Atucha, Santa Lucía, Candelaria
 the San José system with 7 lakes: Llama Mikhu, San José I, San José II, Buena Ventura, Llama Kunka, Wak'ani, Providencia
 the Suras or Calderón system with 1 lake: Calderón
 the San Ildefonso system with 3 lakes: Khari Khari Lakes (San Ildefonso, San Pablo, now integrated into San Ildefonso), San Fernando
 the San Sebastián system with 6 lakes: Muñisa, Masuni, Criciza, San Lázaro, San Sebastián, Planilla (now integrated into San Sebastián)
 the Challwiri system with 2 lakes: Illimani, Tawaqu Ñuñu or Challwiri.

South of Jach'a Molino Pampa there are two more systems:
 the Lakha Ch'akha system with one lake: Lakha Ch'akha
 the Ch'alluma system with Ch'alluma (I and II) and Turina.

Other notable lakes are T'ala Qucha and Q'umir Qucha.

See also 

 Cordillera de los Frailes

Notes 
 Names with a star (*) stand for mountain names by Evelio Echevarría used in a paper about his expeditions to the range because the original local names were not available

References

 apemin.eu Rene Joaquino Cabrera, Aporte al plan de desarollo municipal de Potosí 2007-2011

Mountain ranges of Bolivia